Le Montet is a commune in the Allier department in Auvergne-Rhône-Alpes in central France.

Population

Sights
Castle of Laly, which is an 18th-century building.

See also
Bourbonnais
Communes of the Allier department

References

Communes of Allier
Allier communes articles needing translation from French Wikipedia